Evelyn Mayr (born 12 May 1989) is a former Italian tennis player.

Her career-high singles ranking is world No. 301, achieved on 19 July 2010. On 20 September 2010, she peaked at No. 247 in the doubles rankings. Evelyn is the older sister of former professional player Julia Mayr.

ITF Circuit finals

Singles: 13 (7 titles, 6 runner-ups)

Doubles: 16 (7–9)

See also
 Julia Mayr
 List of female tennis players

References

External links
 
 

1989 births
Italian female tennis players
Living people
Germanophone Italian people
Italian people of German descent
People from Olang
Mediterranean Games gold medalists for Italy
Competitors at the 2009 Mediterranean Games
Mediterranean Games medalists in tennis
Sportspeople from Südtirol
21st-century Italian women